Cnemalobus is a genus of beetles in the family Carabidae, containing the following species:

 Cnemalobus araucanus Germain, 1901
 Cnemalobus bruchi Roig-Junient, 1993
 Cnemalobus coerulescens (Chaudoir, 1861)
 Cnemalobus convexus Germain, 1901
 Cnemalobus cyaneus (Brulle, 1834)
 Cnemalobus cyathicollis (Solier, 1849)
 Cnemalobus cylindricus Roig-Junient, 1994
 Cnemalobus deplanatus Roig-Junient, 1993
 Cnemalobus desmarestii (Guerin-Meneville, 1838)
 Cnemalobus gayi Putzeys, 1868
 Cnemalobus germaini Putzeys, 1868
 Cnemalobus litoralis Roig-Junient, 1993
 Cnemalobus mendozensis Roig-Junient, 1993
 Cnemalobus montanus Roig-Junient, 1994
 Cnemalobus neuquensis Roig-Junient, 1993
 Cnemalobus nuria Roig-Junient, 1994
 Cnemalobus obscurus (Brulle, 1834)
 Cnemalobus pampensis Putzeys, 1868
 Cnemalobus pegnai (Negre, 1973)
 Cnemalobus piceus Roig-Junient, 1994
 Cnemalobus plicicollis (Fairmaire, 1884)
 Cnemalobus pulchellus Roig-Junient, 1994
 Cnemalobus reichardti Roig-Junient, 1994
 Cnemalobus striatipennis Roig-Junient, 1994
 Cnemalobus striatus Guerin-Meneville, 1838
 Cnemalobus substriatus (G.R.Waterhouse, 1841)
 Cnemalobus sulcatus (Chaudoir, 1854)
 Cnemalobus sulcifer Philippi, 1864

References

Pterostichinae